Wahyu Wijiastanto is an Indonesian former footballer who last played for Persip Pekalongan in the Liga 2. He played for Indonesia U-23 in the Asian Games with Ahmad Bustomi, Tony Sucipto, Zulkifli Syukur, Fandy Mochtar, and Irfan Bachdim.

International career 
Wahyu Wijiastanto received his first senior international cap against Saudi Arabia national football team on October 7, 2011. He represented Indonesia in 2014 World Cup qualifying.

Indonesian's goal tally first.

Honours

Club honours
Persiba Bantul 
Liga Indonesia Premier Division (1): 2010-11
Semen Padang
Indonesian Community Shield (1): 2013

Individual honours
Liga Indonesia Premier Division Best Player (1): 2010-11

References

1986 births
Living people
Javanese people
Association football defenders
Indonesian footballers
Indonesia international footballers
Indonesian Premier League players
Persijap Jepara players
Persis Solo players
Persiba Bantul players
Semen Padang F.C. players
Footballers at the 2006 Asian Games
Asian Games competitors for Indonesia
Sportspeople from Central Java